Typhlodrominae is a subfamily of mites in the Phytoseiidae family.

Genera
 Africoseiulus Chant & McMurtry, 1994
 Australiseiulus Muma, 1961
 Chanteius Wainstein, 1962
 Cocoseius Denmark & Andrews, 1981
 Cydnoseius Muma, 1967
 Galendromimus Muma, 1961
 Galendromus Muma, 1961
 Gigagnathus Chant, 1965
 Kuzinellus Wainstein, 1976
 Leonseius Chant & McMurtry, 1994
 Metaseiulus Muma, 1961
 Meyerius van der Merwe, 1968
 Neoseiulella Muma, 1961
 Papuaseius Chant & McMurtry, 1994
 Paraseiulus Muma, 1961
 Silvaseius Chant & McMurtry, 1994
 Typhlodromina Muma, 1961
 Typhlodromus Scheuten, 1857
 Typhloseiopsis De Leon, 1959
 Typhloseiulus Chant & McMurtry, 1994

References

Phytoseiidae
Arthropod subfamilies

es:Australiseiulus